Thomas Edward King, Jr. (born July 19, 1947) is an American politician. A Republican, he served for nearly two decades in the Mississippi Legislature before successfully running for the Southern District seat on the state Transportation Commission in 2011.

References

External links

Republican Party Mississippi state senators
Republican Party members of the Mississippi House of Representatives
1947 births
Living people
20th-century American politicians
21st-century American politicians
People from Hattiesburg, Mississippi
People from Petal, Mississippi
University of Southern Mississippi alumni